Diphu (Pron:ˈdɪfu:) is the headquarter of Karbi Anglong district in the state of Assam in India. This small town is a popular tourist hill station for people of nearby cities.

Etymology
The word Diphu came from Dimasa language, meaning White Water (Di for Water, and Phu for White).  Historically, it is said that the stream in Diphu carries large amounts of sediment during the rainy season, giving it a whitish colour, hence its name.

Geography

It has an average elevation of 186 metres (610 feet). It is about 270 km by road and 213 km by railways from Guwahati. The town is located on a beautiful hill.

Demographics
 India census, Diphu had a population of 63,654. Based on population, it is classified as a class-II city (between 50,000 and 99,999 inhabitants). Males constitute 52% of the population and females 48%. Diphu has an average literacy rate of 90%, higher than the national average of 59.5%. The male literacy rate is 94% and female literacy rate is 86%. In Diphu, 13% of the population is under 6 years of age. The major indigenous communities living in Diphu are Karbi, Dimasa Kachari, Garo Kachari and Rengma Naga.

Language

 
Karbi is the most spoken language at 25,045 speakers, followed by Bangali at 13,400 and Assamese at 8,007, Hindi is spoken by 5,277 people, Bodo at 1,909 and Nepali at 2,712.

Culture
The town is home to many indigenous communities and other communities from rest of the country. Dimasas, Karbis, Rengma, Tiwa Kachari, Bodo Kachari, Garo Kachari and Rabha being the major tribes of the district. The town exhibits peaceful and harmonious coexistence among them. It houses temples, churches, mosques and gurudwaras. The town celebrates all the major festivals together with much fun-fare. Rongker, Bushu-Dima, Wangala, Bihu, Sikpui-Ruoi, Christmas, Durga Puja, Diwali, Baikho and other festivals are celebrated with fervour and joy.

Educational institutions 

Assam University, Diphu Campus
Diphu Government College
Diphu Law College
Diphu Medical College and Hospital
IGNOU study centre
Industrial Training Institute (ITI).
Presbyterian Mission School

Health infrastructure
 Diphu Medical College and Hospital

Transportation

Road
National Highway 329A connect the town to outside place. Diphu is well connected to most districts and important towns of Assam by Government and private buses. Shared Car also ply between nearby town and places. Auto rickshaw is the main mode of transport within the town.

Rail
The town is served by Diphu railway station of Northeast Frontier Railway zone which lies on Lumding–Dibrugarh section. Many crucial trains connect the town like Dibrugarh Rajdhani Express, Brahmaputra Mail, Kamrup Express, Jan Shatabdi Express, Chandigarh Express, Nagaland Express etc.

Sports
Football is the most popular sport in Karbi Anglong. The multipurpose Karbi Anglong Sports Association (KASA) Stadium is home to Karbi Anglong Morning Star FC, a professional football club based in Diphu. It competes in the top division Assam State Premier League. Currently, there is one Stadium at KASA Sports Complex and another under construction at Chutianala, Diphu.

Politics

Diphu town is under Diphu (Vidhan Sabha constituency). This constituency form a part of Autonomous District (Lok Sabha constituency).

Notable people
 Horen Sing Bey: Present-M.P.
 Biren Sing Engti: Former-M.P.
 Jayanta Rongpi: Former-M.P.
 Late Semsonsing Ingti
Founder of undemarcated Karbi Anglong district (The then Mikir Hills).

See also
Diphu Pass

References

Cities and towns in Karbi Anglong district